Water gel may refer to:

Water gel (plain), water-absorbing polymer
Water gel explosive, slurry of oxidizers or fuels